The 2000 Winchester Council election took place on 4 May 2000 to elect members of Winchester District Council in Hampshire, England. One third of the council was up for election and the Liberal Democrats stayed in overall control of the council.

After the election, the composition of the council was:
Liberal Democrat 36
Conservative 10
Independent 5
Labour 4

Campaign
One third of the seats were being contested, with an extra seat being up for election in St Bartholomew ward after the sitting Conservative councillor, Flick Drummond, emigrated to the USA and thus failed to attend any council meetings in the required 6-month period. The Liberal Democrats had a majority of 13 seats before the election and despite defending 9 seats were expected to remain in control of the council. 3 sitting councillors, all Liberal Democrats, stood down at the election, Miranda Bulloch, Phrynette Dickens and Alan Laidlaw.

The Conservatives campaigned on a promise to reduce council tax by 5% over the next 4 years and attacked the Liberal Democrats over the closure of car parks in the city centre. However the Liberal Democrats alleged lies had been said about the car parks, and said the Conservatives would have to cut services if they were to reduce council tax.

The Conservatives also complained about the Liberal Democrat controlled council publishing a newsletter during the campaign. They claimed that it was propaganda for the Liberal Democrats and favoured sitting councillors, however the Liberal Democrats said that the Conservative leader on the council had approved the newsletter and that the Conservatives were avoiding the real issues.

Election result
The results saw the Liberal Democrats increase their control of the council, making 2 nets gains to have an overall majority of 17. They gained seats in Compton and Shawford, St Bartholomew and Wonston wards, but lost one back to the Conservatives in New Alresford. Despite this the Conservatives said that they were pleased to have won more votes across the whole council than the Liberal Democrats, with many seats seeing very close results. Meanwhile, one Labour candidate, Oliver de Peyer, only won 7 votes in Shedfield ward, the lowest by any major party candidate in elections for Winchester council and a repeat of his performance in Sparsholt in 1998. Overall turnout in the election was 39.97%, with the highest turnout being recorded in Droxford, Soberton & Hambledon ward at 57.68%.

Ward results

References

2000
2000 English local elections
2000s in Hampshire